Viettesia griseovariegata is a moth in the subfamily Arctiinae. It was described by Hervé de Toulgoët in 1954. It is found on Madagascar.

References

Moths described in 1954
Lithosiini